Adwick railway station serves the communities of Adwick le Street and Carcroft, in the Metropolitan Borough of Doncaster, South Yorkshire, England. Located on the line linking Leeds to Doncaster via Wakefield, immediately south-east of the point where it passes beneath Church Lane, the present station is the second to serve Adwick: the first, the main building of which still stands, lay on the other side of the present road bridge.

History
Opened in March 1866 as an intermediate stop on the West Riding and Grimsby Railway's main line from Wakefield Westgate to Doncaster, the station was at first called "Adwick-le-Street and Carcroft"; the name was changed in 1880 to "Carcroft and Adwick-le-Street".

The station's main building, which still stands today – though no longer part of the present station – comprised a booking office, waiting room, and station master's house. Situated on the Doncaster-bound (up) platform, it was constructed of rock-faced stone, with hipped roofs and a spire which was part of the living quarters. The Leeds-bound (down) platform was served by a small wooden, enclosed waiting shelter. This station was closed for goods traffic in June 1965 and for passengers in November 1967.

Adwick was reopened, with new platforms to the south-east of the original station site, by the South Yorkshire Passenger Transport Executive and British Rail in 1993.

Facilities
The station is listed as being unstaffed on the National Rail website, but it has a staffed travel centre (run by SYPTE) that sells rail tickets. There are waiting rooms, CIS displays and timetable poster boards on both platforms; step-free access to both sides is via a ramped footbridge at the north end or lifts in the other footbridge at the south end.

Services
Within reach of the A1 Junctions 37 and 38 and just off the A638, Adwick station provides a park and ride for Doncaster and a commuting station for Wakefield and Leeds. The station has ample free parking.

Northern operates an hourly  to  service that stops here. In the evenings and on Sundays (both hourly) the station is served only by the Doncaster to Leeds stopping trains.

Notes

References

External links

 Adwick station on navigable O. S. map

Railway stations in Doncaster
DfT Category F1 stations
Former West Riding and Grimsby Railway stations
Railway stations in Great Britain opened in 1866
Railway stations in Great Britain closed in 1967
Railway stations opened by British Rail
Railway stations in Great Britain opened in 1993
Northern franchise railway stations
Carcroft and Adwick-le-Street railway station
1866 establishments in England
Adwick le Street